Auto polarity or auto-polarity may refer to:

 Auto polarity (digital multimeter), automatic polarity switching for signals in measurement devices
 Auto polarity (differential signals), automatic polarity switching of differential signals
 Auto polarity (Ethernet), automatic polarity of differential pairs in networking

See also 
 Auto crossover
 Bridge rectifier
 Polarity inversion (disambiguation)
 Polarity switch